is a Japanese film producer of anime and a long-time colleague of Hayao Miyazaki, as well as a co-founder and the former president of Studio Ghibli. Suzuki is renowned as one of Japan's most successful producers after the enormous box office success (in Japan) of many Ghibli films.

Early life
Suzuki was born in Nagoya in Aichi Prefecture in 1948. In 1967 he enrolled at Keio University and graduated with a degree in literature in 1972.

Career
His professional career started at Tokuma Shoten, joining the company shortly after graduation. He was assigned to the planning department of Asahi Geino, entertainment, magazine, where he was responsible for the manga coverage page. Here he had a long anticipated meeting with cartoonist Shigeru Sugiura. In 1973 he became the editor of the magazine's supplement , for which he worked with and befriended film directors, such as Sadao Nakajima, Eiichi Kudo and Teruo Ishii, as well as animators and manga artists, like Osamu Tezuka, George Akiyama, Kazuo Kamimura,  and Shotaro Ishinomori. During a hiatus of the comic supplement he was reassigned to the performing arts feature section of Asahi Geino, for which he covered such varied topics as Bōsōzoku, Japanese motorcycle gangs, and the bombing of the headquarters of Mitsubishi Heavy Industries by the East Asia Anti-Japan Armed Front. From this period he has mentioned  as a memorable person. In 1975 Suzuki was assigned to the editorial department of the monthly . One of the series he worked on is Wakusei Robo Danguard Ace. In 1978 he became an editor for the, newly created, monthly magazine Animage, under its first editor-in-chief Hideo Ogata.

In his capacity as Animage editor he approached Isao Takahata and Miyazaki, who had worked on the animated feature film Hols: Prince of the Sun, for a feature article in the inaugural issue of the magazine but they declined. Suzuki and Miyazaki encountered each other again after the release of The Castle of Cagliostro when Suzuki again approached Miyazaki for an Animage article. This time the meetings result in an enduring collaborative relationship. In July 1981 Suzuki unsuccessfully pitched Miyazaki's original idea for an animated story, . The Miyazaki article, was published in the August 1981 issue of Animage magazine. About the issue Suzuki has stated: "here is where it all started". Suzuki was among those who facilitated the creation and publication of Miyazaki's manga, Nausicaä of the Valley of the Wind. He was instrumental in getting the Nausicaä anime made and helped establish Studio Ghibli after the film's release. The film was released on March 11, 1984. Studio Ghibli was founded in June 1985. Miyazaki has stated, "If it were not for Mr. Suzuki, there wouldn't have been Studio Ghibli." 
Ghibli co-founder Takahata, producer on the Nausicaä film, has acknowledged the pivotal role of Suzuki in bringing the Nausicaä manga series into the world and used nearly identical words as Miyazaki to acknowledge Suzuki's essential role in the creation of Studio Ghibli. Takahata also credits Suzuki for his steadfast support of Miyazaki and has cited Suzuki's responsibility for making his friendship with Miyazaki endure.

In 1985 Suzuki was also involved with the theatrical release of Kunihiko Yuyama's GoShogun: The Time Étranger, which was released on April 24. In 1986 Suzuki served on the production committee for the Studio Ghibli film Laputa: Castle in the Sky for Tokuma Shoten, released in August, and he succeeded Ogata as Animage editor-in-chief in October. In 1988 he again served on Tokuma Shoten's production committee. This time for the Ghibli films My Neighbor Totoro, directed by Miyazaki, and Grave of the Fireflies directed by Takahata. Suzuki was able to get the films made and released by proposing them as a double feature for theatrical release. He was associate producer on Kiki's Delivery Service and officially joined the studio as producer in 1989, after he had resigned from Tokuma Shoten in October.

In 1990 Suzuki was appointed director of the Studio Ghibli company. He was producer on Only Yesterday in 1991 and Porco Rosso in 1992. Suzuki was in charge of the Ocean Waves project, directed by Tomomi Mochizuki, created by Studio Ghibli for television, which aired in Japan in 1993. The following year he worked as producer on Takahata's theatrical release Pom Poko. In 1995 he produced director Yoshifumi Kondō’s Whisper of the Heart and On Your Mark, theatrically released together in 1995. The latter is a short animated promotional video created by Studio Ghibli for the Japanese pop-duo Chage and Aska. In 1995 Suzuki also became the producer on the next feature length Ghibli film project, released, in 1997, under the title he had selected, Princess Mononoke. In 1997 Studio Ghibli and Tokuma Shoten merged and Suzuki became the inaugural President. 1999 saw the release of Takahata's My Neighbors the Yamadas for which Suzuki was the producer.

In the year 2000 the live-action film Shiki-Jitsu, was released, directed by Hideaki Anno and produced by Suzuki. The animated feature-length film Spirited Away had its premiere on July 20, 2001. In October that same year the Ghibli Museum was opened. In 2002 director Hiroyuki Morita’s The Cat Returns and  Ghiblies episode 2, directed by Yoshiyuki Momose, had their theatrical release. In 2003 Spirited Away won the Academy Award for Best Animated Feature. Suzuki assumed the role of producer for Innocence directed by Mamoru Oshii, which was released in Japanese theatres in March 2004. Howl's Moving Castle had its theatrical release in November that same year.

In March 2004, Studio Ghibli became independent from Tokuma Shoten and Suzuki was appointed Ghibli corporation president. He stepped down from the position in 2008. As of 2014 he still serves as the company's managing director and continues to work as film producer.

In March 2014, Suzuki retired as a producer and assumed a new position of general manager at Studio Ghibli. However, he has continued to assist with other projects, including acting as a co-producer for The Red Turtle (2016), and lead producer for Earwig and the Witch (2020). He is currently producing How Do You Live? with Miyazaki.

Accolades
In 2014, Suzuki was nominated for the Academy Award for Best Animated Feature as the producer of The Wind Rises, along with Hayao Miyazaki as the film's director.

In 2014, at the 64th Annual MEXT Art Encouragement Prizes Toshio Suzuki was awarded the Grand Prize for his involvement as producer in The Wind Rises and The Tale of the Princess Kaguya.

In 2017, Suzuki was again nominated for the Academy Award for Best Animated Feature as the producer of The Red Turtle.

In 2022, Suzuki received the Winsor McCay Award which is presented at the annual Annie Awards.

Filmography

Publications in English

References

External links
 Miyazaki Quote from Nausicaa.net (an extensive English language source on Ghibli's films and other related anime works.)

Japanese film producers
Japanese animated film producers
Studio Ghibli people
1948 births
Living people
People from Nagoya